Rodina (Motherland) is a Russian illustrated popular science and history magazine headquartered in Moscow, Russia. It was established in January 1989 as a continuation of the magazine with the same name established in the Russian Empire in 1879. The founders of the magazine are the Government of the Russian Federation and the Administration of the President of the Russian Federation

In July 2005 the Higher Attestation Commission of Russia included Rodina into its "List of Leading Peer-Reviewed Journals and Publications". (This list is for the journals where the major results from theses for the higher scientific degrees (kandidat and doktor) must be published.)

In August 2007 the magazine was awarded with the state honorary badge "For Active Work on Patriotic Upbringing of the Citizens of the Russian Federation" ("За активную работу по патриотическому воспитанию граждан Российской Федерации").

References

History magazines
Magazines established in 1989
Magazines published in Moscow
Popular science magazines
Science and technology magazines published in Russia
Russian-language magazines